Laying on the table may refer to:
 Table (parliamentary procedure), laying a motion on the table
 Laying before the house, laying a document on the table